A speed limit is the limit of speed allowed by law for road vehicles, usually the maximum speed allowed. Occasionally, there is a minimum speed limit. Advisory speed limits also exist, which are recommended but not mandatory speeds. Speed limits are commonly set by the legislative bodies of national or local governments.

Overview
The following tables show various jurisdictions' default speed limits (where applicable) that apply to different types of vehicles travelling on three different types of road. Actual speed limits may range beyond these values. Speeds are listed in kilometres per hour unless otherwise stated. The enforcement tolerance is specified in km/h or percentage above the stated limit. For the United Kingdom and the United States, the speed limit is still listed in miles per hour.

Germany is the only country where some motorways do not have a maximum speed limit. The 130 km/h is sign-posted as a general advisory speed limit for motorways in the entry of the country. Due to those Autobahns, Germany is considered a country without a general speed limit on its highways. The Isle of Man is the only jurisdiction without a general speed limit on rural two-lane roads.

Definitions
Numerous countries have a different general speed limit for urban roads than on remaining roads. Such differences exist since the beginning of the 20th century, in countries such as United Kingdom and France. This concept is formally defined as road within built-up area in various regulations, including Vienna convention, even if UK has re-branded them as street lighted or restricted area. More informally they are known as urban road. In 2017, most of all IRTAD countries have a default speed limit in urban roads of 50 km/h, with various lower speeds, for instance, in the Netherlands, 70% of the urban roads are limited to 30 km/h.

Some countries, for instance the US, India or China, do not have a specific urban road maximum speed.

Different speed limits exist for heavy good vehicles (HGV) but the limit for HGV is country dependent: while most Eurasian and American countries might use the Vienna convention's 3.5-tonne limit, other countries in North America, China, India, Australia or Ireland might use different weight limits.

Countries

Footnotes

References

 
Traffic law
Road safety
Law enforcement